On 9 November 1971, a Royal Air Force Lockheed Hercules C.1 crashed into the sea off the coast of Livorno by Meloria shoal, Italy, killing all 46 passengers and 6 crew. At the time it was described by Italian officials as the worst military air disaster in Italy in peacetime.

Crash
The Hercules serial number XV216, from RAF Lyneham in Wiltshire, was due to carry out an early morning parachute drop at Cagliari, Sardinia, as part of a large-scale joint training exercise called Coldstream. Ten aircraft were to be involved; nine Hercules and one Hawker Siddeley Andover. Their order of takeoff was marked by a serial number, chalked onto the fuselage of each aircraft. The Hercules known as Chalk 4 was the fourth of the 10 aircraft due to depart at fifteen-minute intervals from San Giusto military airport in Pisa, Italy. The aircraft crashed near the Meloria rocks, four miles west of Livorno. At Pisa, the stream take-off was cancelled, another four aircraft had followed XV216 into the air but the last two were prevented from departing.

All 52 on board were killed, they included five British aircrew from 24 Squadron, a British parachute jumping instructor from No. 1 Parachute Training School at RAF Abingdon and 46 Italian paratroopers from the Folgore Parachute Brigade.

Recovery
It was at first difficult to find the wreckage due to a persistent wind and low clouds. The cause of the accident was not found.

Memorial

A memorial plaque was erected in Livorno in 2003 to commemorate the accident.  On 21 November 2006, a memorial service was held in Pisa, attended by a delegation from No. 24 Squadron, current operators of the C-130J Hercules, and relatives of the lost crew members.

Notes

I: Five of the ten aircraft were from the Royal Air Force.

References

Sources

Falciglia, Aldo (November/December 2011). "Gesso quattro non-risponde" – La sciagura alle secche della Meloria. Folgore (Associazione Nazionale Paracadutisti d'Italia) (Nos. 11–12)

Aviation accidents and incidents in 1971
Aviation accidents and incidents in Italy
1971 in Italy
Accidents and incidents involving the Lockheed C-130 Hercules
Accidents and incidents involving Royal Air Force aircraft
November 1971 events in Europe